Eucalyptopsis is a genus of describing two species of trees, constituting part of the plant family Myrtaceae and included in the eucalypts group. They have botanical records of growing naturally in New Guinea and the Moluccas, within the Malesia region. Plant geneticists have found their closest evolutionary relatives in the monotypic genera and species Stockwellia quadrifida and Allosyncarpia ternata.

Species
 Eucalyptopsis alauda  – New Guinea incl. Woodlark Island
Synonym: Eucalyptopsis sp. aff. papuana  (1951)
 Eucalyptopsis papuana  – New Guinea, Moluccas

References

Myrtaceae genera
Myrtaceae
Taxonomy articles created by Polbot
Australasian realm flora